Robert Charles Brewster (1921 - December 20, 2009 Washington, DC) was the American Ambassador to Ecuador from 1973 until 1976 and Inspector General of the Department of State from 1979 until 1981.  During his tenure as ambassador, the US lifted the ban on military sales to Ecuador “in an effort to improve relations with Latin America.”

Biography
Ambassador Brewster attended Grinnell College before transferring to the University of Washington, Class of 1943.  He enlisted in the Navy and went to Midshipman's School at Columbia before being assigned to the USS O'Brien (DD-415).  When he returned from the Navy, he studied international affairs at Columbia University for two years.

Brewster died at the age of 88 at a retirement community in Washington having suffered from Parkinson's Disease and stomach cancer.  He was a native of Beatrice, Nebraska.

References

1921 births
2009 deaths
Ambassadors of the United States to Ecuador
People from Beatrice, Nebraska
University of Washington alumni
Grinnell College alumni
School of International and Public Affairs, Columbia University alumni
United States Inspectors General by name
United States Navy personnel of World War II